Achmad Hisyam Tolle  (born 7 January 1994) is an Indonesian banned footballer who plays as a fighter and defender.

Honours

International 
Indonesia U-21
 Hassanal Bolkiah Trophy runner-up: 2012

References

External links 
 
 Achmad Hisyam at Liga Indonesia

1994 births
Living people
Indonesian footballers
Bhayangkara F.C. players
Sriwijaya F.C. players
Mitra Kukar players
Persiba Balikpapan players
PSS Sleman players
Borneo F.C. players
PSIM Yogyakarta players
Liga 1 (Indonesia) players
Liga 2 (Indonesia) players
Sportspeople from Makassar
Association football midfielders
21st-century Indonesian people